The 1993 Scottish League Cup final was played on 24 October 1993, at Celtic Park in Glasgow and was the final of the 48th Scottish League Cup competition. The final was contested by Rangers and Hibernian. Rangers won the match 2–1 thanks to goals by Ian Durrant and Ally McCoist.

Match details

References

External links 
 Soccerbase

1993
League Cup Final
Scottish League Cup Final 1993
Scottish League Cup Final 1993
1990s in Glasgow
October 1993 sports events in the United Kingdom